NUTmobile is a series of automobiles shaped like a peanut owned by Kraft Heinz which are used to promote and advertise Planters products in the United States. The first version was created in 1935. Drivers of the NUTmobile are known as “Peanutters”. Nine "Peanutters" are selected to drive three Nutmobiles across the country in the given year. These brand representatives are typically recent college graduates with degrees in advertising, marketing, public relations, and communications. The University of Illinois at Urbana-Champaign has a history of recruiting students with representatives in 2014-2015, 2016-2017, 2018–2019, and 2019-2020. During the year, "Peanutters" travel across the country giving out peanut samples, Mr. Peanut memorabilia, and other products from the Planters brand. The program is based in Madison, WI and "Peanutters" go through two weeks of 'Peanut Prep' where they learn about speaking on behalf of the Planters brand, Planters history, and learn to drive the vehicles. Mr. Peanut also accompanies the "Peanutters" and is present at each event they attend offering photos, autographs, and hugs to interested customers.

The first Nutmobile in the current decade started in 2011 as a food truck. With incredible success and consumer intrigue, the tour changed to what it is today - an experiential marketing icon. In  2014, two more NUTmobiles were created to the fleet to cover more of the United States.  The current NUTmobile is a converted 2014 Isuzu. In 2019, a brand new NUTmobile was created for the 2019 Planters Super Bowl commercial. The new NUTmobile replaced the old, 2011 NUTmobile on the national tour.

See also 
Wienermobile

References

External links 

 Instagram

One-off cars
Art vehicles
Kraft Heinz